The Oklahoma Panhandle State Aggies (or OPSU Aggies) are the athletic teams that represent Oklahoma Panhandle State University, located in Goodwell, Oklahoma, in intercollegiate sports as a member of the National Association of Intercollegiate Athletics (NAIA), primarily competing in the Sooner Athletic Conference (SAC) for most of its sports since the 2017–18 academic year. The Aggies previously competed in the Heartland Conference of the NCAA Division II ranks from 2002–03 to 2016–17.

Varsity teams

OPSU competes in 18 intercollegiate varsity sports: Men's sports include baseball, basketball, cross country, football, golf, soccer and track & field; while women's sports include basketball, cheerleading, cross country, golf, soccer, softball, track & field and volleyball; and co-ed sports include equestrian, rodeo and shooting sports.

Athletics Facilities

Athletics Building 
The Aggies Athletics Building was renovated on the backside of the McKee Library on campus, in 2019. This building consists of a two levels. The main floor houses the offices of the Aggies athletic support staff, conference room and team meeting room which includes a stage, 3 projector screens and 120 theater quality leather seats. On the second level, are various offices of coaching staff members.

Anchor D Stadium at Carl Wooten Field 
Anchor D Stadium at Carl Wooten Field is the home of both football and soccer (men/women). Renovations to the 5,000+ person capacity stadium was completed in 2018. With stadium lights and a video board, fans can enjoy watching a game day or night. In addition, Carl Wooten Field also received an upgrade with brand new synthetic turf being laid in 2018, which provides an optimal playing surface for the Aggies no matter the weather conditions.

Weight Room 
Renovated in 2019, the Aggies sports teams have a sports specific strength and conditioning gym to use on a daily basis. With more than eight different racks and dead lift platforms and various other equipment, each program has enough space for large group workouts.

Anchor D Arena at Oscar Williams Field House 
Anchor D Arena at Oscar Williams Field House is the home of basketball (men/women), volleyball and athletic training room, as well as providing locker rooms for football, soccer (men/women), and softball. Renovations to the gym in late 2020 included the installment of new lights and flooring which add to the game day experience of fans and players.

Aggies Baseball and Softball Fields 
Both the Aggies Baseball and Softball Fields are located on campus. With bleachers and press box behind home plate, fans can stay close to the action at all home games.

Individual sports

Football
The football team plays at Carl Wooten Field and at one point competed in the Central States Football League (CSFL) until after the 2017 fall season. Previously, the Aggies competed in the NCAA Division II Lone Star Conference during the 2016 fall season. In the early nineties, OPSU Aggies football was known as a football powerhouse in the NAIA. The program has recently had some success thanks to the late Mike Wyatt (2007–2010). The 2010 team produced the Aggie football program's first winning season since 2004, going 6–5. The current coach, Russell Gaskamp, has set new records in player involvement in community service activities.

Soccer 
The Aggies Men's Soccer was founded on April 1st, 2019. The team practices and plays on campus at Anchor D Stadium at Carl Wooten Field. In their inaugural season, the men finished with an overall record of 9-6-2, including a conference record of 4-4-1. The men achieved a berth into the Sooner Athletic Conference (SAC) conference tournament quarterfinal, where they fell (2-1) in overtime to eventual conference tournament finalist Science & Arts (OK).

Rodeo
A point of pride for OPSU is its men's and women's rodeo teams. The school is a member of the Central Plains Region of the National Intercollegiate Rodeo Association (NIRA) and has won several regional and national championships in the sport. As part of their scholarship package, rodeo team members may receive lodging in special housing and stalls for their animals.

References

External links